Durie may refer to:

 Andre Durie (1981– ), Canadian football player
 Andrew Durie, (?? -1588), bishop
 Clan Durie, a Scots clan
 Dave Durie (1931–2016), English football player
 David Durie (1944– ), British civil servant and former governor of Gibraltar
 Edward Taihakurei Durie (1940– ), New Zealand judge
 George Durie (c. 1496- 1577), Scots abbot 
 Gordon Durie (1965– ), Scots footballer 
 Ian Dury (1942–2000), English rock and roll singer-songwriter
 Jamie Durie (1970– ), Australian horticulturalist  
 Jo Durie (1960– ) tennis player
 Mason Durie (community leader) (1889–1971), tribal leader from New Zealand 
 Mason Durie (psychiatrist) (1938– ), New Zealand professor
 Mark Durie Australian vicar and author
 Raymond Durie of Durie (1905–1999), Scots soldier and clan chief

See also
 Dury (disambiguation)